Pinaka  (from Sanskrit: पिनाक, see Pinaka)  is a multiple rocket launcher produced in India and developed by the Defence Research and Development Organisation (DRDO) for the Indian Army. The system has a maximum range of 40 km for Mark-I and 60 km for Mark-I enhanced version, and can fire a salvo of 12 HE rockets in 44 seconds. The system is mounted on a Tatra truck for mobility.
Pinaka saw service during the Kargil War, where it was successful in neutralising Pakistani positions on the mountain tops. It has since been inducted into the Indian Army in large numbers.

As of 2014, about 5,000 missiles are being produced every year while an advanced variant is under development with enhanced range and accuracy.

As of 2019, an upgraded guided missile version of the system has been test-fired, with a range of over 90 km.

Development 
The Indian Army operates the Russian BM-21 Grad Launchers. In 1981, in response to the Indian Army's need for a long range artillery system, the Indian Ministry of Defence sanctioned two confidence building projects. In July 1983, the Army formulated their General Staff Qualitative Requirement (GSQR) for the system, with planned induction of one Regiment per year from 1994 onwards. This system would eventually replace the Grads.

Development began in December 1986, with a sanctioned budget of  26.47 crore. The development was to be completed in December 1992. Armament Research and Development Establishment (ARDE), a Pune-based DRDO laboratory, led the development of the system. To decrease single source dependency from Ordnance Factory Board (OFB) and increase competition in product pricing front, final developmental trials of Pinaka manufactured fully by Indian private sector Solar Industries under transfer-of-technology agreement from DRDO were successfully conducted by Indian Army at Pokhran Range on 19 August 2020.
A series of 6 rockets were tested successfully for extended range version of Pinaka from Chandipur on 4 November 2020 that is now going to replace the older Mark I variant in production. This time DRDO has decreased the size of the rockets compared to the older generation Mark I.
 
On 24 June 2021, DRDO successfully fired 25 Pinaka Mk I Enhanced variant at a range of 45 km in quick succession mode as part of saturation attack simulation. On 25 June 2021 DRDO successfully test fired 40 km range 122mm caliber rocket which are made to replace the older BM-21 Grad rockets in the Indian Army.

On 11 December 2021, two different variants were simultaneously test fired from Pokhran Range. First one was done by Solar Industries for Pinaka Mark 1 Enhanced with a range of 45 km. The second one was called Pinaka Area Denial Munition (ADM) made by Yantra India Limited (YIL) in which 96.6% of Dual-Purpose Improved Conventional Munition (DPICM) exploded instead of the required benchmark set at 90%, thus decreasing the failure rate. Both the tests were successful. During these tests, ARDE evaluated locally developed Direct-Action Self Destruction (DASD) and Anti-Tank Munition (ATM) fuzes.   

As part of developmental tests, Pinaka Mark 1 Enhanced and Pinaka ADM were fired from Army Test Range at Pokhran for consistency and accuracy on 9 April 2022. The user trials were conducted on 24 August 2022.

Details 

Pinaka is a complete MBRL system, each Pinaka battery consists of: six launcher vehicles, each with 12 rockets; six loader-replenishment vehicles; three replenishment vehicles; two Command Post vehicle (one stand by) with a Fire Control computer, and the DIGICORA MET radar. A battery of six launchers can neutralise an area of 1,000 m × 800 m.

The Army generally deploys a battery that has a total of 72 rockets. All of the 72 rockets can be fired in 44 seconds, taking out an area of 1 km2. Each launcher can fire in a different direction too. The system has the flexibility to fire all the rockets in one go or only a few. This is made possible with a fire control computer. There is a command post linking together all the six launchers in a battery. Each launcher has an individual computer which enables it to function autonomously in case it gets separated from the other five vehicles in a war.

K J Daniel, Project Director, Pinaka, calls it “a system” and explains how massive each system is. A Pinaka battery has six launchers, six loader vehicles, six replenishment vehicles, two vehicles for ferrying the command post and a vehicle for carrying the meteorological radar, which will provide data on winds.

Modes of operation 
The launcher can operate in the following modes:

Autonomous mode. The launcher is fully controlled by a fire control computer (FCC). The microprocessor on the launcher automatically executes the commands received from the FCC, giving the operator the status of the system on displays and indicators.

Stand-alone mode: In this mode, the launcher is not linked to the FCC operator, and the operator at the console enters all the commands for laying of the launcher system and selection of firing parameters.

Remote mode: In this mode, a remote control unit carried outside the cabin up to a distance of about 200 m can be used to control the launcher system, the launcher site and to unload the fired rocket pods from the launcher.

Manual mode: All launcher operations including laying of the system and firing are manually controlled. This mode is envisaged in the situations where the microprocessor fails or where there is no power to activate the microprocessor-based operator's console.

The Pinaka was tested in the Kargil conflict and proved its effectiveness. Since then it has been inducted into the Indian Army and series production has been ordered. The Pinaka MBRL is stated to be cheaper than other systems.

Salient features

 Use of state-of-the-art technologies for improved combat performance
 Total operational time optimised for shoot & scoot capability
 Cabin pressurisation for crew protection in addition to blast shields
 Microprocessor-based fully automatic positioning and fire control console
 Night vision devices for driver and crew
 Neutralisation/destruction of the exposed troop concentrations, B-Class military land vehicles and other such soft targets
 Neutralisation of enemy guns/rocket locations
 Laying of anti-personnel and anti-tank mines at a short notice.

Orders 
The Pinaka project has been a significant success for the DRDO and its development partners in developing and delivering a state of the art, high value project to the Indian Army's demanding specifications. While DRDO was responsible for the overall design and development, its partners played a significant role in developing important subsystems and components. They include Tata Power SED, Larsen & Toubro, Solar Industries, Munitions India Limited and Yantra India Limited.

The first Pinaka regiment was raised in February 2000. Each regiment consists of three batteries of six Pinakas each, plus reserves. On 29 March 2006, the Indian Army awarded Tata Power SED and Larsen & Toubro's Heavy Engineering Division a contract worth , to produce 40 Pinaka MBRLs each. Tata Power SED declared that it would be delivering the first units within six months.

On March 18, 2016, the Cabinet Committee on Security (CCS) cleared the purchase of two additional Pinaka regiments. To supplement the earlier 4 regiments, an order for additional six regiments was cleared by the Defence Acquisition Council on 7 November 2016. Ministry of Defence signed ₹2,580 crore contract with BEML Limited, Tata Power SED and Larsen & Toubro on 31 August 2020 to supply six Pinaka regiments with 70% indigenous content by 2024.

Deployment 

Each Pinaka regiment consists of three batteries of six Pinaka launchers; each of which is capable of launching 12 rockets with a range of 40 km in a space of 44 seconds. In addition to these, a regiment also has support vehicles, a radar and a command post.

The Pinaka will be operated in conjunction with the Indian Army's Firefinder radars and Swathi Weapon Locating Radar of which 28 are on order. The Indian Army is networking all its artillery units together with the DRDO's Artillery Command & Control System (ACCS), which acts as a force multiplier. The ACCS is now in series production. The Pinaka units will also be able to make use of the Indian Army's SATA (Surveillance & Target Acquisition) Units which have been improved substantially throughout the late 1990s, with the induction of the Searcher-1, Searcher-2 and IAI Heron UAVs into the Indian Army, as well as the purchase of a large number of both Israeli made and Indian made Battle Field Surveillance radars. These have also been coupled with purchases of the Israeli LORROS Long-Range Reconnaissance and Observation System which is a combination of FLIR/CCD system for long range day/night surveillance.

Presently, 7 regiments of Pinaka have now been inducted by the Army. A total of 126 launcher units are active with combine of the 7 regiments, with Each regiment has 18 launcher units. An additional 3 are on order and in November 2016 the MoD has cleared a RFP for 6 more regiments. This led to the signing of a contract on 31 August 2020 for six additional regiments worth of launchers at Rs 2,580 crore from Tata Power Company Ltd. (TPCL) and engineering major Larsen & Toubro (L&T). Defence public sector undertaking Bharat Earth Movers Ltd (BEML) which will provide the vehicles will also be part of the project.

The Indian Army has plans to operate a total of 16 regiments by 2022 and increase this to 22 within the next 6 years as the older Grad MLRS regiments are retired.
On 9 April 2022, DRDO successfully tested the extended Pinaka MBRL at the Pokhran ranges. The extended range Pinaka MBRL is set to start replacing the shorter range Mk-1 variant of the Indian Army soon. The extended variant has a range from 65 to 90 km which doubles the range of the artillery that uses the DRDO-made Pinaka and Russian Grad MBRLs. In addition, the extended range Pinaka rockets can be armed with the Pinaka Area Denial Munitions which were also tested on 9 April.

Mk II Development 

Pinaka Mk II is being developed by Armament Research and Development Establishment (ARDE), Pune; Research Centre Imarat (RCI), Hyderabad; and Defence Research and Development Laboratory (DRDL), Hyderabad. Another variant of Mark II called Guided Pinaka is equipped with a navigation, guidance, control kit and has considerably enhanced the range and accuracy of the missile. The range of the missile is estimated to be between 60 km-75 km at all ranges.

It was successfully tested at the Chandipur Test Range in January 2013, and on 20 December 2013. From 20 to 23 May 2016, four rounds of the Pinaka Mk-II were successfully fired from the test range of Proof and Experimental Establishment (PXE) at Chandipur-on-sea for testing a new guidance system. On 12 January 2017 and 24 January 2017, two successful tests was conducted with range of 65 km and 75 km respectively from Launch Complex-III, Integrated Test Range, Chandipur. On 30 May 2018, two rounds of tests were successfully conducted from Launch Complex-III, ITR, Chandipur. Another round of tests was conducted successfully on 11 March 2019. An extended range version was tested for a range up to 90 km on 19 December 2019, followed by another test on 20 December.

Pinaka Mark 2 manufactured by Solar Industries completed User Assisted Technical Trial (USTT) on 8 December 2021 and will now go for user trial which will be completed by March 2022. While Yantra India Limited (YIL) is developing prototype of Pinaka Mark 2 due to delay in transfer of technology by ARDE.

Future Plans 

The Pinaka is in the process of further improvement. Israel Military Industries teamed up with DRDO to implement its Trajectory Correction System (TCS) on the Pinaka, for further improvement of its CEP. This has been trialled and has shown excellent results. The rockets can also be guided by GPS to improve their accuracy. A wraparound microstrip antenna has been developed by DRDO for this system.

While the Pinaka will not be developed further into a larger system, its success and the experience gained from the programme has led the ARDE and its partner organisations, to launch a project to develop a long range MRL similar to the Smerch MRLS. A 7.2-metre rocket for the Pinaka MBRL, which can reach a distance of 120 km and carry a 250 kg payload will be developed. These new rockets can be fired in 44 seconds, have a maximum speed of mach 4.7, rise to an altitude of 40 km before hitting its target at Mach 1.8. Integrating UAVs with the Pinaka is also in the pipeline, as DRDO intends to install guidance systems on these rockets to increase their accuracy. Sagem completed delivery of its Sigma 30 laser-gyro artillery navigation and pointing system to be equipped with the Pinaka multiple launch rocket system in June 2010. The Sigma 30 artillery navigation and pointing system is designed for high-precision firing at short notice.

Exports 
Armenia signed a combined deal worth  for 4 Pinaka batteries and other defense equipment. The order includes supplies of extended range and guided rocket for Pinaka system in the future. Indonesia and Nigeria have also shown interest in Pinaka multi-barrel rocket launcher.

Specifications

Operators

 Indian Army - 4 regiments in service as of 2020. Six MK1 regiments ordered in September 2020, with deliveries scheduled to be completed by 2024.

Future operators

 Armenian Ground Forces - 4 batteries ordered in September 2022.

See also 
 
 ASTROS II 
 BM-21 Grad
 BM-27
 T-122 Sakarya
 Fajr-5
 TOROS
 Falaq-2 
 M142 HIMARS 
 M270 Multiple Launch Rocket System
 TOS-1
 Weishi Rockets
 9A52-4 Tornado

References

External links 
Technical:
 DRDO Technology Focus : Warhead for Missiles, Torpedoes and Rockets
 Artillery Rocket Systems

Wheeled self-propelled rocket launchers
Indian Army
Defence Research and Development Organisation
Military vehicles of India
Artillery of India
Multiple rocket launchers
Modular rocket launchers
Military vehicles introduced in the 2000s